Ron Santa Teresa (IBC: RST) is a rum producer brand of Venezuela. It is the first of Venezuela, with more than two hundred years of tradition of fabrication of aged rums. Its current president is the Venezuelan businessman Alberto C. Vollmer, who belongs to the fifth generation of the family dedicated to the rum production in Venezuela. The seat of the company is located at the Santa Teresa Estate, founded in 1796 by the Earl Martín Tovar Ponte, where it currently is an agroindustrial, touristic and sports complex.

History 
At the end of the 16th century sugar cane was already being grown in the valleys of the modern day Aragua state, in the north of Venezuela. In 1796 Count Martín Tovar Ponte, signer of the Venezuelan Act of Independence, named the terrain in honor of the “Santa Thereza” patroness. After the property suffered damage caused by the royalists during the War of Independence, a young man of German descent Gustav Julius Vollmer Ribas, grandson of the general José Félix Ribas, bought the property and started to produce the first Venezuelan rum in 1896.

Starting from 1989, the estate stated to offer guided visits inside the property to explain visitors the rum elaboration process and the premises. Among the attractions there are "The Rum Route", which includes the "Tovar House" and the "Rum Museum", the "Private Cellar", the "Solitary Hatchery", the La Guadalupe sector, the coffee roaster, the cane fields, the "Aragua Cross", the distillery, the bottling plant and the El Consejo train station.

Project Alcatraz Rugby 
 is a rehabilitation program for youth with behavior problems that has managed to disband at least ten gangs without the use of violence. The program started in 2003, after a robbery to the company where a security guard was almost killed. One of the robbers was captured and offered to work for the company for three months as sentence. Another member was captured afterwards and made the same offer, until twenty-two members of the gang joined; they were taught how to read and write. Although the original idea was that the gang members worked in the state, its owner, Vollmer, had the idea of rehabilitating them with rugby. The program has had over two hundred participants and has expanded to include a rugby school program as well as a communitarian one, with a total of at least two thousand young people that train rugby in the state to move away from crime.

References

External links
Top 100 Spirits in the World from Wine Enthusiast
Drink of the Week: Santa Teresa 1796 Solera Rum from Imbibe
"Distilling Order From Chaos: Making Santa Teresa Rum in Venezuela" from Daily Beast

1955 establishments in Venezuela
Food and drink companies established in 1955
Drink companies of Venezuela
Sport in Aragua
Companies listed on the Caracas Stock Exchange
Rugby union in Venezuela
Venezuelan rum
Venezuelan brands